The Territories of Mexico are part of the history of 19th and 20th century independent Mexico. The country created territories (territorios) for areas too lightly populated to be states, or for political reasons.

The 1824 Constitution of Mexico defined four territories. Seven others were created later in the 19th and early 20th centuries.

See also
History of Mexico

 
History of Mexico
Independent Mexico